Anne Leilehua Lanzilotti is a Kanaka Maoli composer, sound artist, and scholar of contemporary classical music.

Early life and education 
Lanzilotti grew up in Honolulu, Hawaiʻi. She began her violin studies with Hiroko Primrose, renowned pedagogue and protégé of Shinichi Suzuki. In addition to western classical music, Lanzilotti studied Hawaiian language, culture, and dance at Hālau Hula O Maiki. Lanzilotti attended Punahou School and Beijing Normal University Middle School No. 2 (School Year Abroad), and then continued her education at Oberlin College Conservatory of Music, Yale School of Music, and Manhattan School of Music. She was a fellowship violist in both the New World Symphony and the Rundfunk-Sinfonieorchester Berlin.

Professional life 
As a performer, Lanzilotti is known for her collaborations with living composers such as Dai Fujikura, Ted Hearne, Andrew Norman, Caroline Shaw, Anna Thorvaldsdottir, Jagoda Szmytka, Scott Wollschleger, and Nina C. Young. Lanzilotti premiered Dai Fujikura's Viola Concerto, Wayfinder, at the Tokyo Metropolitan Theatre during the 2022 Born Creative Festival.

In addition to her work as a soloist, she has performed as a guest with Alarm Will Sound, Ensemble Éschappé, Ensemble Interface, Ensemble Signal, International Contemporary Ensemble, and with bands such as DeVotchKa, and She & Him. Lanzilotti performed in the Björk Vulnicura Live tour in New York City, and appears on the album of the same name.

As an Andrew Norman scholar, Lanzilotti has written for Neue Zeitschrift für Musik, London Symphony Orchestra, and has spoken at conferences internationally on Norman's use of architecture and visual art as musical inspiration. Her doctoral dissertation is also on the topic of music and architecture in Norman's string trio, The Companion Guide to Rome. Lanzilotti is the creator of Shaken Not Stuttered, a free online resource demonstrating extended techniques for strings.

In her role as Curator of Music at The Curtis R. Priem Experimental Media and Performing Arts Center (EMPAC), she invited artists such as Ethan Heard & Heartbeat Opera, Sarah Hennies, Ken Ueno, and in 2020–21 season commissioned Maria Chavez, Lesley Flanigan, Bora Yoon, Pamela Z, Caroline Shaw and Vanessa Goodman, King Britt and Saul Williams, Miya Masaoka, and Mary Kouyoumdjian and Alarm Will Sound.

Lanzilotti has been on the faculty at New York University, University of Northern Colorado, Casalmaggiore International Music Festival, Point CounterPoint and Wintergreen Performing Arts. Lanzilotti was co-founder and artistic consultant for Kalikolehua – El Sistema Hawaiʻi. She is currently on the faculty teaching composition and viola at UH Mānoa.

Music 
Lanzilotti's compositions are characterized by the frequent use of field recordings and extended techniques. She creates soundscapes that invite the audience to engage with sound and listen carefully to the subtleties of resonance. “Lanzilotti’s score brings us together across the world in remembrance, through the commitment of shared sonic gestures.” (Cities & Health) The 2022 Pulitzer Prize in Music committee noted that her work "distinctly combines experimental string textures and episodes of melting lyricism."

Lanzilotti has been commissioned by The Noguchi Museum several times to write musical works.  [Switch~ Ensemble] received a MAP Fund grant for the development and performance of her new work hānau ka ua. Lanzilotti has also been commissioned by groups such as Roomful of Teeth, Merian Ensemble, and Argus Quartet. She was a 2021 McKnight Visiting Composer.

Her album in manus tuas (New Focus Recordings, 2019), was featured in Bandcamp's The Best Contemporary Classical Albums of 2019 and The Boston Globe Top 10 Classical Albums of 2019. Other albums including Lanzilotti's music are her debut EP Wanderweg and experimental LP The Akari Sessions.

In 2022 Lanzilotti's work with eyes the color of time, commissioned by The String Orchestra of Brooklyn and premiered at Tenri Cultural Institute in New York City, was selected as a Pulitzer Prize Finalist in Music.

Awards and Honors 

 Finalist, Pulitzer Prize in Music, with eyes the color of time, 2022
 OPERA America, Opera Grant for Women Composers: Discovery Grant, 2022
 Chamber Music America, Artistic Projects for a new work for Longleash on Toshiko Takaezu’s sculptures, 2022
 Empowering ʻŌiwi Leadership Award (E OLA), 2022
 First Peoples Fund Artist in Business Leadership Fellowship, 2022
 New World Symphony, Build, Learn, Understand and Experiment (BLUE) Alumni Award, 2022
 McKnight Visiting Composer, 2021
 National Performance Network, Creation & Development Fund 2021
 MAP Fund for [Switch~ Ensemble] for development and performance of hānau ka ua, 2020
 Native Launchpad Advancing Indigenous Performance Award, 2020–23

Discography

Compositional Discography 

 String Orchestra of Brooklyn: enfolding. New York, NY: New Focus Recordings, 2022
 Jordan Bak: Impulse. Bright Shiny Things, 2022
 India Gailey: to you through. North Vancouver, BC: Red Shift Records, 2022
 Adam Morford and Anne Leilehua Lanzilotti: Yesterday is Two Days Ago. Self-release, 2021
 Borderlands Ensemble: the space in which to see. New Focus Recordings, 2021
 Lanzilotti: in manus tuas (New Focus Recordings, 2019)
 The Yes &: Thrush (2017) music by Lanzilotti and Gahlord Dewald
 Lanzilotti: Wanderweg EP (2017) Works for viola(s) and electronics

Performing Discography 
 Dai Fujikura: Star Compass on Glorious Clouds. Tokyo: Sony Japan, 2021
 Anna Thorvaldsdottir: Sola. New York, NY: New Focus Recordings, 2020
 Jacob Cooper: Terrain (New Amsterdam Records, 2020)
 Ted Hearne: hazy heart pump (New Focus Recordings, 2019)
David Lang: Anatomy Theater (Cantaloupe Music, 2019)
Lanzilotti: in manus tuas (New Focus Recordings, 2019)
Scott Wollschleger: Soft Aberration (New Focus Recordings, 2017)
 Dai Fujikura: Chance Monsoon (Sony Japan & Minabel, 2017)
 Björk: Vulnicura Live (One Little Indian Records, 2015).
 Ted Hearne: The Source (New Amsterdam Records, 2015)
 Joan Osborne: Love and Hate (Womanly Hips, 2014)
 Sean Hickey: Pied A Terre (Delos Productions, Inc., 2014)
Rundfunk-Sinfonieorchester Berlin: Leoš Janácek – Mša Glagolskaja (Missa Solemnis) & Taras Bulba (Pentatone, 2013)
 Rundfunk-Sinfonieorchester Berlin: Richard Wagner – Parsifal (Pentatone, 2012)
 Rundfunk-Sinfonieorchester Berlin: Richard Wagner – Der fliegende Holländer (Pentatone, 2011)

Selected compositions 
on stochastic wave behavior—eight voices (2021), commissioned by Rónadh Cox, with the support of the National Science Foundation.
with eyes the color of time for string orchestra (2020), commissioned by the String Orchestra of Brooklyn
find (2019) for viola and electronics, commissioned by Kieran Welch
beyond the accident of time for percussion and voices (2019), commissioned by The Noguchi Museum, premiered June 13, 2019
the space in which to see for French horn, violin, viola, and cello (2019), commissioned by Johanna Lundy for the Borderlands Ensemble
of moments for baritone and baroque violin (2018) commissioned by Jesse Blumberg and Johanna Novom
to you (the architects are most courageous) for two violins, viola, cello, and piano (2018)
Postcards II: Akari for viola, voice, harp, and fixed media (2018) Commissioned by The Noguchi Museum, premiered April 6, 2018
 gray for viola and percussion (2017)
 birth, death, for obsidian sound sculptures, strings, and voice (2017). Commissioned by The Noguchi Museum
 Casalmaggiore for viola(s) and electronics (2016)
 leap year for viola(s) and electronics (2016)
 with their I you your fuse for double bass (2016)

Selected publications 
Written
 "Alone at Noguchi" Program notes for koʻu inoa and Star Compass (The Noguchi Museum, 2020)
 "Music is Everywhere Steeped in Time," The 20/19 Project Monograph (Studio Will Dutta, 2019)
"A Trip to the Moon" (London Symphony Orchestra, 2017)
 "Anna Thorvaldsdottir: A Part of Nature" (Music & Literature, 2017)
 "Architektur der Gesellschaft: Der US-Amerikanische Komponist Andrew Norman" (Neue Zeitschrift für Musik, 2017)
 "'Cut to a Different World': Andrew Norman" (Music & Literature, 2016)
 "Andrew Norman's The Companion Guide to Rome: Influence of Architecture and Visual Art on Composition" (DMA Diss, Manhattan School of Music, 2016)
Editions of musical scores
 Sonnets by Andrew Norman, edited by Lanzilotti – viola & piano
 "Josephine (the Singer)" by Martin Bresnick, edited by Lanzilotti – solo viola

References

External links

Shaken Not Stuttered

1983 births
Living people
American classical composers
American women classical composers
American classical violists
Women violists
People of Native Hawaiian descent
Yale School of Music alumni
Oberlin Conservatory of Music alumni
Manhattan School of Music alumni
21st-century American women musicians
21st-century violists